Bartolomeo Pedon (Venice, 1665- Venice, 1732) was an Italian painter of the late-Baroque period.

He mainly painted landscapes, often nocturnes or whimsical architecture capricci in a wild landscape. In this he appears to be influenced by Marco Ricci and Antonio Marini, but also by Magnasco and Salvatore Rosa. Many of his works are still in private hands.

Other sources say he was born in 1655 in Padua, and worked in 
Monastery of San Benedetto.

References

External links

1665 births
1732 deaths
17th-century Italian painters
Italian male painters
18th-century Italian painters
Painters from Venice
Italian landscape painters
Rococo painters
Italian Baroque painters
18th-century Italian male artists